The green bush squirrel (Paraxerus poensis) is a species of rodent in the family Sciuridae. It is found in Benin, Cameroon, the Republic of the Congo, the Democratic Republic of the Congo, Ivory Coast, Equatorial Guinea, Gabon, Ghana, Guinea, Liberia, Nigeria, and Sierra Leone.

Habitat 

Its natural habitats are subtropical or tropical moist lowland forest and plantations.

References

Paraxerus
Mammals described in 1830
Taxonomy articles created by Polbot